is a private vocational school in the city of Suginami, Tokyo Japan. The school opened in 1924 and has admitted only female students.

References

External links 
 Tokyo Junior College of Nurtures

Educational institutions established in 1924
Christian schools in Japan
1924 establishments in Japan